Varenicline (trade name Chantix and Champix) is a medication used for smoking cessation. Varenicline is also used for the treatment of dry eye disease.

The most common side-effects include nausea (feeling sick), insomnia (difficulty sleeping), abnormal dreams, headache and nasopharyngitis (inflammation of the nose and throat).

It is a high-affinity partial agonist for nAChRα4β2, a subtype of nicotinic acetylcholine receptor (nAChR) that leads to the release of the neurotransmitter dopamine in the nucleus accumbens (reward center of the brain) when activated, and therefore, has the capacity to reduce the feelings of craving and withdrawal caused by smoking cessation. In this respect it is similar to cytisine and different from the nicotinic antagonist bupropion and nicotine replacement therapies (NRTs) like nicotine patches and nicotine gum. It is estimated that varenicline successfully helps one of every eleven people who smoke remain abstinent from tobacco at six months.

It is on the World Health Organization's List of Essential Medicines. It is available as a generic medication. In 2020, it was the 275th most commonly prescribed medication in the United States, with more than 1million prescriptions.

Medical uses
Varenicline is used to help people stop smoking tobacco (smoking cessation). A meta-analysis found that less than 20% of people treated with varenicline remain abstinent from smoking at one year. In a 2009 meta-analysis, varenicline was found to be more effective than bupropion (odds ratio 1.40) and nicotine replacement therapies (NRT) (odds ratio 1.56).

A 2013 Cochrane overview and network meta-analysis concluded that varenicline is the most effective medication for tobacco cessation and that smokers were nearly three times more likely to quit tobacco use while on varenicline than with placebo treatment. Varenicline was more efficacious than bupropion or NRT and as effective as combination NRT for tobacco smoking cessation.

Varenicline has not been tested in those under 18 years old or pregnant women and therefore is not recommended for use by these groups. Varenicline is considered a class C pregnancy drug, as animal studies have shown no increased risk of congenital anomalies; however, no data from human studies is available. An observational study is currently being conducted assessing for malformations related to varenicline exposure, but has no results yet. An alternate drug is preferred for smoking cessation during breastfeeding due to lack of information and based on the animal studies on nicotine.

Side effects
Mild nausea is the most common side effect and is seen in approximately 30% of people taking varenicline, though this rarely (<3%) results in discontinuation of the medication. Other less common side effects include headache, difficulty sleeping, and vivid dreams. Rare side effects reported by people taking varenicline compared to placebo include change in taste, vomiting, abdominal pain, flatulence, and constipation. It has been estimated that for every five subjects taking varenicline at maintenance doses, there will be an event of nausea, and for every 24 of 35 treated subjects, there will be an event of constipation or flatulence. Gastrointestinal side-effects lead to discontinuation of the drug in 2% to 8% of people using varenicline. Incidence of nausea is dose-dependent: incidence of nausea was higher in people taking a larger dose (30%) versus placebo (10%) as compared to people taking a smaller dose (16%) versus placebo (11%).

Depression and suicide
In 2007, the US FDA had announced it had received post-marketing reports of thoughts of suicide and occasional suicidal behavior, erratic behavior, and drowsiness among people using varenicline for smoking cessation. In 2009, the US FDA required varenicline to carry a boxed warning that the drug should be stopped if any of these symptoms are experienced.

A 2014 systematic review (literature research) did not find evidence of an increased suicide risk. Other analyses have reached the same conclusion and found no increased risk of neuropsychiatric side effects with varenicline. No evidence for increased risks of cardiovascular events, depression, or self-harm with varenicline versus nicotine replacement therapy was found in one post-marketing surveillance study.

In 2016, the FDA removed the black box warning. People are still advised to stop the medication if they "notice any side effects on mood, behavior, or thinking."

Cardiovascular disease
In June 2011, the US FDA issued a safety announcement that varenicline may be associated with "a small, increased risk of certain cardiovascular adverse events in people who have cardiovascular disease."

A prior 2011 review had found increased risk of cardiovascular events compared with placebo. Expert commentary in the same journal raised doubts about the methodology of the review, concerns which were echoed by the European Medicines Agency and subsequent reviews. Of specific concern were "the low number of events seen, the types of events counted, the higher drop-out rate in people receiving placebo, the lack of information on the timing of events, and the exclusion of studies in which no-one had an event."

In contrast, multiple recent systematic reviews and meta-analyses have found no increase in overall or serious adverse cardiovascular events (including for individuals at risk of developing cardiovascular disease) associated with varenicline use.

Mechanism of action
Varenicline displays full agonism on α7   nicotinic acetylcholine receptors and is a partial agonist on the α4β2, α3β4, and α6β2 subtypes. In addition, it is a weak agonist on the α3β2 containing receptors.

Varenicline's partial agonism on the α4β2 receptors rather than nicotine's full agonism produces less effect of dopamine release than nicotine's. This α4β2 competitive binding reduces the ability of nicotine to bind and stimulate the mesolimbic dopamine system—similar to the method of action of buprenorphine in the treatment of opioid addiction.

Pharmacokinetics
Most of the active compound is excreted by the kidneys (92–93%). A small proportion is glucuronidated, oxidised, N-formylated or conjugated to a hexose. The elimination half-life is about 24 hours.

History
Use of Cytisus plants as a smoking substitutes during World War II led to use as a cessation aid in eastern Europe and extraction of cytisine.  Cytisine analogs led to varenicline at Pfizer.

Varenicline received a "priority review" by the US FDA in February 2006, shortening the usual ten-month review period to six months because of its demonstrated effectiveness in clinical trials and perceived lack of safety issues. The agency's approval of the drug came on May 11, 2006. On September 29, 2006, it was approved for sale in the European Union.

On September 16, 2021, Pfizer announced a recall of "all lots of its anti-smoking treatment, Chantix [Varenicline], due to high levels of cancer-causing agents called nitrosamines in the pills". This followed a July 2, 2021, announcement by the FDA that it was "alerting patients and health care professionals to Pfizer's voluntary recall of nine lots of the smoking cessation drug" and further recalls by Pfizer on July 19 and Aug. 8. On June 24, Pfizer had paused distribution of Chantix worldwide; "[t]he distribution halt [wa]s out of an abundance of caution, pending further testing, the company said in an email. According to the Pfizer Inc. 2020 Form 10-K Annual Report, high-revenue products by the company include[d] Chantix/Champix (varenicline) to treat nicotine addiction, which recorded direct product revenues of more than $1 billion in 2019, $919 million in 2020, and $398 million in 2021 (the lower 2021 revenue was due, in part, to the basic product patent expiration for Chantix in the U.S. in Nov 2020 and in Europe in Sep 2021, and the aforementioned Pfizer voluntary recall across multiple markets and a global pause in shipments of Chantix). 

In October 2021, US FDA approved Oyster Point Pharma to market Tyrvaya as a new route of varenicline administration through nasal spray for the treatment of dry eye disease.

References

External links 
 
 
 

5-HT3 agonists
Benzazepines
Bridged heterocyclic compounds
Nicotinic agonists
Pfizer brands
Quinoxalines
Smoking cessation
World Health Organization essential medicines